Kim Johnston Ulrich (born Kim Charisse Johnston) is an American actress. 

Born Kim Charisse Johnston, she is the daughter of Mr. and Mrs. George P. Johnston. She graduated with an Associate of Arts degree in fashion merchandising from Modesto Junior College and with a Bachelor of Arts degree in art from Stanislaus State College.

Before Ulrich became an actress, she worked as a model, appearing in national magazines.

From 1983 to 1986, Ulrich played the role of Diana McColl on As the World Turns. In 1987 she appeared in an episode of The Charmings as Cinderella. In 1988, she guest-starred in two episodes of Werewolf. Also in 1988 she appeared as Rachel  in an episode of Cheers (S7:2). In 1990, Ulrich appeared on the TV series Wings as Carol, Brian's former wife. In 1993, Ulrich appeared in the pilot episode of Lois & Clark: The New Adventures of Superman as Dr. Antoinette Baines, a villainous scientist. She appeared in a third-season episode of Highlander: The Series in 1995. She appeared in the first episode of season 4 of Diagnosis Murder as a conniving wife in the episode "Murder by Friendly Fire" in 1996.

In 1999, she played the role of Dorothy "Dottie" Strudwick in two episodes of 3rd Rock from the Sun. She played the role of Ivy Winthrop Crane on NBC's daytime drama Passions from 1999 to 2008. In 2010 and 2011, she played the role of Doctor Visyak on The CW television series Supernatural in the episodes "Like a Virgin", "Let It Bleed", and "The Man Who Knew Too Much". She also played Nancy Hargrove in the eighth-season episode "A Man Walks Into a Bar..." of NCIS.

She married casting director Robert J. Ulrich on January 3, 1981, in Modesto, California. They have two children, Cooper and Tierney.

References

External links
 
 
 

Living people
20th-century American actresses
21st-century American actresses
Actresses from California
American film actresses
American soap opera actresses
American television actresses
People from San Joaquin County, California
Year of birth missing (living people)